Syed Zai Abbas Shah is a Pakistani politician who had been a Member of the Provincial Assembly of Sindh, from May 2013 to May 2018.

Early life and education
He was born on 12 August 1975 in Tando Allahyar.

He has a degree of Master of Arts from Sindh University.

Political career

He was elected to the Provincial Assembly of Sindh as a candidate of Pakistan Peoples Party from Constituency PS-51 TANDO ALLAYAR-I in 2013 Pakistani general election.

References

Living people
Sindh MPAs 2013–2018
1975 births
Pakistan People's Party politicians
University of Sindh alumni